Hobart Van Zandt Bosworth (August 11, 1867 – December 30, 1943) was an American film actor, director, writer, and producer.

Early life
Bosworth was born on August 11, 1867, in Marietta, Ohio. His father was a sea captain in the Civil War.

When Bosworth was 12 years old, he ran away to sea. In June 1885, he was on shore leave in San Francisco when an opportunity arose for him to join McKee Rankin's stage company. That led to a theatrical career for him.

Career

Thinking he would like to become a landscape painter, a friend suggested that he work as a stage manager to raise the money to study art. Acting on his friend's advice, Bosworth obtained a job with McKee Rankin as a stage manager at the California Theatre in San Francisco. Earning some money, he undertook the study of painting. Eventually, he was pressed into duty as an actor in a small part with three lines. Though he botched the lines, he was given other small roles. Bosworth was eighteen years old, and on the cusp of a life in the theater.

Hobart signed on with Lewis Morrison to be part of a road company for a season as both an actor and as Morrison's dresser, playing Shakespeare's Cymbeline and Measure for Measure. During his time with the company, Hobart and another writer wrote a version of Faust that Morrison used for twenty years in repertory. By 1887, he was acting at the Alcazar Theatre in San Francisco. He became proficient enough on stage to give Shakespearean canon by the time he was twenty-one years old, though he admitted that he was the worst Macbeth ever.

Bosworth eventually wound up in Park City, Utah, where he worked in a mine, pushing an ore wagon in order to raise money. He escaped the pits to tour with the magician Hermann the Great as the conjurer's assistant for a tour through Mexico.

For the first time in eleven years, the 21-year-old Bosworth met his father. Hobart recalled, "He looked at me and said, "Hum! I couldn't lick you now, son." They never met again.

He arrived back in New York in December 1888, and was hired by Augustin Daly to play "Charles the Wrestler" in As You Like It. He did so well in the role, Daly kept him on. Bosworth remained with Daly's company for ten years, in which he played mostly minor parts. Seven times while he was with the company they made foreign tours, playing in Berlin, Cologne, London, Paris and other European cities. Playing exclusively small parts eroded his confidence, and Bosworth left Daly to sign on with Julia Marlowe, who cast him in leads in Shakespearean plays.

Just as Bosworth began to taste stage stardom in New York, he was stricken with tuberculosis, a disease often fatal in the 19th and early 20th centuries. Bosworth was forced to give up the stage, and he was not allowed to exert himself indoors. Though he made a rapid recovery, he returned to the stage too quickly and suffered a relapse. For the rest of his working life, he balanced his acting with periods of rest so as to keep his tuberculosis in remission.

Bosworth re-established himself as a lead actor on the New York stage, appearing in the 1903 Broadway revival of Henrik Ibsen's Hedda Gabler. He also appeared that year on the Great White Way as the lead in Marta of the Lowlands. This role propelled him to Broadway stardom. However, he was forced again to give up the stage when he lost seventy pounds in ten weeks due to his illness.

Bosworth moved to Tempe, Arizona, to partake of the climate to improve his health. Eventually, he got the disease under control again. While not severely handicapped, he was forced to remain in a warm climate lest he suffer a relapse. The disease robbed him of his voice as well, but there was a new medium for actors: silent films.

Bosworth moved to San Diego, and in 1908 he was contracted to make a motion picture by the Selig Polyscope Company. Shooting was to be done in the outdoors, and he did not have to use his voice, which was in poor condition. Bosworth once said, "I believe, after all, that it is the motion pictures that have saved my life. How could I have lived on and on, without being able to carry out any of my cherished ambitions? What would my life have meant? Here, in pictures, I am realizing my biggest hopes." Signing with the Selig Polyscope Co., Hobart eventually convinced the movie company to move to Los Angeles. Bosworth is widely credited with being the star of the first movie made on the West Coast.

Due to his role in pioneering the film industry in California, Bosworth often was referred to as the "Dean of Hollywood". He wrote the scenarios for the second and third pictures he acted in, and directed the third. According to his own count, he eventually wrote 112 scenarios and produced eighty-four pictures with Selig. Bosworth was attracted to Jack London's work due to his out-of-doors filming experience and the requirements of his health, which precluded acting in studios.

Hobart Bosworth Productions Company
In 1913, he started his own company, Hobart Bosworth Productions Company, to produce a series of Jack London melodramas. He produced and directed the company's first picture, playing Wolf Larsen in The Sea Wolf. London himself appeared as a sailor. The movie was released in the U.S. by The W. W. Hodkinson Corp. and States Right Independent Exchanges.

D. W. Griffith also released a Jack London picture that year, Two Men of the Desert. Hobart followed up The Sea Wolf with The Chechako. The Chechako and some other Bosworth-London pictures were distributed through Paramount Pictures.
Bosworth also directed the follow-up, The Valley of the Moon, in which had a supporting actor role. He also appeared as an actor in John Barleycorn, which he co-directed with J. Charles Haydon. He produced, directed, wrote, and acted in Martin Eden and An Odyssey of the North, playing the lead in the latter, which was released by Paramount. He finished up the series by producing, directing, and playing the lead in the two-part "Burning Daylight" series, The Adventures of Burning Daylight. Both were released by Paramount.

Soon Bosworth joined the Oliver Photography Company. Subsequently, Bosworth Inc. and Oliver Morosco Productions released a total of thirty-one pictures, most which starred Bosworth. The company ceased operations after producing The Sea Lion.

The merger with Paramount ended the period in Bosworth's creative life where he was a major force in the motion picture industry, which was undergoing changes as the industry matured and solidified. He directed one other picture before the merger, The White Scar, which he also wrote and starred in for the Universal Film Manufacturing Company. After his own production company closed, Hobart wound up playing supporting roles as an actor.

He divorced his first wife, Adele Farrington, in 1919. On 22 December 1920 he married Cecile Kibre, widow of G. Harold Percival, who had been art director at Ince Studio and who had died of influenza in 1918. Cecile Kibre had a son by Percival, named George, whom Hobart Bosworth later adopted as his son.

Bosworth survived motion pictures' transition to sound, or "talkies". Aside from appearing in Warner Brothers' showcase, The Show of Shows (1929), his talking debut proper was in the film short A Man in Peace, for Vitaphone, while his first sound feature was Vitaphone's Ruritanian romance General Crack, starring John Barrymore. Although he appeared in small roles in A-list films, Bosworth primarily made his living as a prominently billed character actor in B-Westerns and serials churned out by Poverty Row studios. In all his roles in A and B pictures, he usually was typecast in a fatherly role, as a clergyman, judge, grandparent, etc.

In 1931, Hobart was cast in principle role of fictional famed explorer in the Antarctic, in Frank Capra's "Dirigible" (1931). As the Hollywood production began, an old airfield in nearby Arcadia, California was converted into a set, complete with "artificial snow, fake ice mounds and painted backdrop attached to the back side of the dilapidated Army barracks." With principal photography slated for September, dry ice in metal containers stuffed in actor's mouths sufficed for the usual Arctic breath. In a 1972 interview, director Frank Capra, on TV's "Dick Cavett Show", Capra recalled a horrible accident on set. Capra asked actors to used dry ice encased in small cages in the mouth, to simulate foggy breath in the scene. Because the small cages were cumbersome in the mouth, a frustrated Hobart Bosworth removed the ice and popped it directly into his mouth for the scene. Soon, Bosworth was rushed to hospital with ice burns in his mouth, resulting in removal of some teeth, jaw bone, and tissue. Though recovery was intensive, Hobart resumed his screen career, continuing on to three dozen more films, through the 1930s, into the 1940s, until his death in 1943.

Death and legacy
On December 30, 1943, Bosworth died of pneumonia in Glendale, California, aged 76. He was entombed in Glendale's Forest Lawn Memorial Park in the Grand Mausoleum's Utility Columbarium, niche 4616. 

For his contributions to the film industry, Bosworth received a motion pictures star on the Hollywood Walk of Fame in 1960. The star is located at 6522 Hollywood Boulevard.

Selected filmography

 The Count of Monte Cristo (1908) - Edmond Dantes (film debut)
 Dr. Jekyll and Mr. Hyde (1908, Short) - Dr. Jekyll / Mr. Hyde
 Rip Van Winkle (1908, Short) - Rip Van Winkle
 Damon and Pythias (1908, Short)
 The Spirit of '76 (1908, Short)
 On Thanksgiving Day (1908, Short)
 The Tenderfoot (1909, Short)
 Boots and Saddles (1909, Short)
 In the Badlands (1909, Short) - Carlton Langdon M.D.
 Fighting Bob (1909, Short) - Fighting Bob
 In the Sultan's Power (1909, Short)
 The Leopard Queen (1909, Short) - Captain Jack Ownes
 Across the Plains (1910, Short)
 The Wonderful Wizard of Oz (1910, Short) - Wizard of Oz and King
 Davy Crockett (1910, Short)
 The Sergeant (1910, Short extant) - Sergeant Robert Adams
 The Sanitarium (1910)
 The Padre (1911) - The Padre - Father Sebastian
 Brown of Harvard (1911) - (uncredited)
 The Count of Monte Cristo (1912)
 Alas! Poor Yorick! (1913, Short) - The Theatre Manager
 The Sea Wolf (1913) - Wolf Larsen
 John Barleycorn (1914) - Scratch Nelson
 Valley of the Moon (1914) - Minor Role
 Martin Eden (1914)
 An Odyssey of the North (1914) - Naass
 Burning Daylight: The Adventures of 'Burning Daylight' in Alaska (1914) - Elam Harnish, aka 'Burning Daylight'
 Burning Daylight (1914)
 The Pursuit of the Phantom (1914) - Richard Alden
 Burning Daylight: The Adventures of 'Burning Daylight' in Civilization (1914) - Elam Harnish, 'Burning Daylight'
 The Country Mouse (1914) - Billy Bladerson
 Buckshot John (1915, Director) - 'Buckshot John' Moran
 Pretty Mrs. Smith (1915) - Minor Role (uncredited)
 Help Wanted (1915) - Jerrold D. Scott
 Little Sunset (1915) - Gus Bergstrom the 'Terrible Swede'
 The Scarlet Sin (1915) - Eric Norton
 Nearly a Lady (1915) - Minor Role as Frederica's Father (uncredited)
 A Little Brother of the Rich (1915) - Henry Leamington
 Business Is Business (1915) - Christ
 'Twas Ever Thus (1915) - Hard Muscle / Col. Warren / John Rogers
 Fatherhood (1915) - Lon Gilchrist
 Colorado (1915) - Thomas Doyle
 The White Scar (1915) - Na-Ta-Wan-Gan
 The Beachcomber (1915) - The sailor
 Tainted Money (1915) - Big Tim
 The Target (1916) - Big Bill Brent
 The Yaqui (1916) - Tambor
 Two Men of Sandy Bar (1916) - John Oakhurst
 Doctor Neighbor (1916) - Dr. Neighbor
 The Iron Hand (1916) - Tim Noland
 The Way of the World (1916) - John Nevill
 Oliver Twist (1916) - Bill Sykes
 Joan the Woman (1916) - Gen. La Hire
 A Mormon Maid (1917) - John Hogue
 Freckles (1917) - John McLean
 Unconquered (1917) - Henry Jackson
 The Inner Shrine (1917) - Derek Pruyn
 The Little American (1917) - German Colonel
 What Money Can't Buy (1917) - Govrian Texler
 Betrayed (1917) - Leopoldo Juares
 The Woman God Forgot (1917) - Cortez
 The Devil-Stone (1917) - Robert Judson
 The Border Legion (1918) - Jack Kells
 Behind the Door (1919, extant; Library of Congress) - Oscar Krug
 Below the Surface (1920, extant; DVD) - Martin Flint
 His Own Law (1920, extant; Library of Congress) - J.C. MacNeir
The Brute Master (1920) - Bucko McAllister, The Brute Master
 A Thousand to One (1920) - William Newlands
 The Foolish Matrons (1921) - Dr. Ian Fraser
 The Cup of Life (1921) - 'Bully' Brand
 Blind Hearts (1921, extant; Library of Congress) - Lars Larson
 The Sea Lion (1921, extant; Library of Congress, DVD) - John Nelson
 White Hands (1922) - 'Hurricane Hardy'
 The Strangers' Banquet (1922) - Shane Keogh
 Man Alone (1923) - Ben Dixon
 Little Church Around the Corner (1923) - John Morton
 Vanity Fair (1923) - Marquis of Steyne
 Rupert of Hentzau (1923) - Col. Sapt
 The Common Law (1923) - Henry Neville
 The Eternal Three (1923) - Dr. Frank R. Walters
 In the Palace of the King (1923) - Mendoza
 The Man Life Passed By (1923) - 'Iron Man' Moore
 Through the Dark (1924) - Warden
 Name the Man (1924) - Christian Stowell
 Nellie, the Beautiful Cloak Model (1924) - Thomas Lipton / Robert Horton
 The Woman on the Jury (1924) - Judge Davis
 Captain January (1924) - Jeremiah Judkins
 Bread (1924) - Mr. Corey
 The Silent Watcher (1924) - John Steele, 'The Chief'
 Hearts of Oak (1924) - Terry Dunnivan
 Hello, 'Frisco (1924) - John Brent
 If I Marry Again (1925) - John Jordan
 My Son (1925) - Sheriff Ellery Parker
 Chickie (1925) - Jonathan
 Zander the Great (1925) - The Sheriff
 The Half-Way Girl (1925) - John Guthrie
 Winds of Chance (1925) - Sam Kirby
 The Big Parade (1925) - Mr. Apperson
 Steel Preferred (1925) - James Creeth
 The Golden Strain (1925) - Maj. Milton Mulford
 The Far Cry (1926) - Julian Marsh
 The Nervous Wreck (1926) - Jud Morgan
 Spangles (1926) - Robert 'Big Bill' Bowman
 Three Hours (1927) - Jonathan Durkin
 Annie Laurie (1927) - The MacDonald Chieftain
 The Blood Ship (1927) - Jim Newman
 The Chinese Parrot (1927) - P.J. Madden
 My Best Girl (1927) - Robert Merrill
 The Smart Set (1928) - Mr. Durant
 Freckles (1928) - McLean
 After the Storm (1928) - Manin Dane
 Hangman's House (1928) - Lord Justice O'Brien
 The Sawdust Paradise (1928) - Isaiah
 Annapolis (1928) - Father
 A Woman of Affairs (1928) - Sir Morton Holderness
 Eternal Love (1929) - Rev. Tass
 Hurricane (1929) - Hurricane Martin
 The Show of Shows (1929) - Executioner - Guillotine Sequence
 General Crack (1929) - Count Hensdorff
 King of the Mountain (1929)
 Mammy (1930) - Meadows
 The Devil's Holiday (1930) - Ezra Stone
 The Office Wife (1930) - McGowan
 Abraham Lincoln (1930) - General Robert E. Lee
 Du Barry, Woman of Passion (1930) - Duc de Brissac
 The Third Alarm (1930) - Precinct Fire Captain
 Just Imagine (1930) - Z-4
 Sit Tight (1931) - Dunlap
 Dirigible (1931) - Louis Rondelle
 Shipmates (1931) - Admiral Corbin
 This Modern Age (1931) - Robert Blake Sr.
 Fanny Foley Herself (1931) - Seely
 Carnival Boat (1932) - Jim Gannon
 The Miracle Man (1932) - The Patriarch
 The County Fair (1932) - Col. Ainsworth
 The Last of the Mohicans (1932, Serial) - Chingachgook, 'the Sagamore'
 No Greater Love (1932) - Doctor
 Million Dollar Legs (1932) - Olympics Starter (uncredited)
 The Phantom Express (1932) - Mr. Harrington
 Lady for a Day (1933) - Governor
 Whom the Gods Destroy (1934) - Alec Klein
 Music in the Air (1934) - Cornelius
 The Keeper of the Bees (1935) - Michael the Bee Master
 Together We Live (1935) - Col. Dickenson
 The Crusades (1935) - Frederick - Duke of the Germans
 Steamboat Round the Bend (1935) - Chaplain
 The Dark Hour (1936) - Charles Carson
 Wolves of the Sea (1936) - Capt. Wolf Hansen
 Wildcat Trooper (1936) - Dr. Martin
 General Spanky (1936) - Col. Blanchard
 Portia on Trial (1937) - Governor
 The Secret of Treasure Island (1938, Serial) - Dr. X
 Rollin' Plains (1938) - John Gospel Moody
 King of the Sierras (1938) - Uncle Hank
 Bullets for O'Hara (1941) - Judge
 One Foot in Heaven (1941) - Richard Hardy Case (uncredited)
 Law of the Tropics (1941) - Davis
 They Died with Their Boots On (1941) - Mr. Cartwright (uncredited)
 Wild Bill Hickok Rides (1942) - Fanatic in Chicago (uncredited)
 Bullet Scars (1942) - Dr. Sidney Carter
 I Was Framed (1942) - D.L. Wallace
 Escape from Crime (1942) - Chaplain (uncredited)
 The Gay Sisters (1942) - Clergyman at Wedding (uncredited)
 Sin Town (1942) - Humiston (final film role)

References

External links

 
 
 
 Hobart Bosworth at Virtual History

1867 births
1943 deaths
American male screenwriters
American male silent film actors
American male stage actors
People from Marietta, Ohio
People from Greater Los Angeles
Male actors from San Francisco
Vaudeville performers
Film directors from California
Film directors from Ohio
19th-century American male actors
20th-century American male actors
Burials at Forest Lawn Memorial Park (Glendale)
Deaths from pneumonia in California
Screenwriters from Ohio
Screenwriters from California
20th-century American male writers
20th-century American screenwriters